Bao Xun (died 226), courtesy name Shuye, was a Chinese politician of the state of Cao Wei during the Three Kingdoms period of China. He was appointed as a minister by Cao Cao in recognition of his father Bao Xin, who was killed in action against the Yellow Turban rebels. Bao Xun was known to be an outspoken minister who would not hesitate to criticise anyone for their mistakes, including his lord. The Wei emperor Cao Pi was frustrated and angry with Bao Xun for his outspoken nature that he demoted him several times during his reign. Eventually, Cao Pi grew tired of Bao Xun and ordered his execution.

See also
 Lists of people of the Three Kingdoms

References

 Chen, Shou (3rd century). Records of the Three Kingdoms (Sanguozhi).
 Pei, Songzhi (5th century). Annotations to Records of the Three Kingdoms (Sanguozhi zhu).

224 deaths
3rd-century executions
Year of birth unknown
Cao Wei politicians
Executed Cao Wei people
Executed people from Shandong
Han dynasty politicians from Shandong
Officials under Cao Cao
People executed by Cao Wei
Politicians from Tai'an